Solomon Walker is an American bass guitarist. He played with Morrissey from 2007-2021 and appears on his albums Years of Refusal and World Peace Is None of Your Business.

Touring with Morrissey
From 2007 to 2014, Walker toured extensively with Morrisey's band throughout North America and Europe. 

Morrissey and his band had a notoriously bad start to their 2011 North American tour, but Walker was noted as part of "same lineup we've seen on previous tours."

In 2012, Rolling Stone noted that they performed at Boston's Wang Theatre the same week as performing on Late Night with Jimmy Fallon, as they started a major tour. The Washington Post called their January 16, 2013 "sold-out gig at Strathmore ... a proudly defiant dissatisfaction."

In 2013, Walker starred in the Morrissey documentary about their tour in Morrissey: 25 Live, which received mixed reviews. While noting Walker as a "starring" role, the Hollywood Reporter said overall, it was "a largely lackluster affair."

In support of World Peace Is None of Your Business, Walker joined Morrissey on the road starting with Albuquerque on May 14, 2014, then 20 gigs across the United States, and ending in Brooklyn's Barclays Center on June 21. In October 2014, the whole band continued its tour to Europe, playing in Rome and Milan, Italy and other cities; on November 6, 2014, in Hannover, Germany, Morrisey announced on social media that Walker was granted a leave of absence from the band, for "compassionate reasons," which turned out to be indefinite.

Other musical work
Prior to joining Morrissey, Walker was a member of the groups Year of the Rabbit, The Joy Circuit, and Cupcakes. He lives in West Hollywood and as of 2016, was recording a studio album with Eastern Shadows.

From 2018 through 2019, Walker joined Bryan Adams on a world tour from Canada, to India, and finally to Spain.

References

External links
 

American rock bass guitarists
American male bass guitarists
Living people
Year of birth missing (living people)